David Lowman may refer to:

 David Lowman (intelligence official) (1921–1999), American executive for the National Security Agency
 David Lowman (priest) (born 1948), British Anglican priest and former archdeacon